Pierre Jamin (born 13 March 1987) is a French footballer who plays as a midfielder for Championnat National 3 side Aurillac.

Career
Jamin started his career with Chamois Niortais, where he joined the youth team in 2001. Five years later, he was promoted to the senior squad and made his debut for the club on 11 May 2007, coming on as a substitute in the 2–1 win over US Créteil-Lusitanos in Ligue 2. During the 2007–08 campaign, he had a loan spell at FC Martigues, where he scored one goal in 15 league appearances. Jamin scored eight league goals in the 2009–10 season as Chamois Niortais won the CFA Group C to gain promotion to the Championnat National. However, he was released at the end of the campaign, and joined local rivals Les Herbiers on 3 June 2010.

Career statistics

References

External links
Pierre Jamin profile at chamoisniortais.fr

1987 births
Living people
People from Cholet
French footballers
Association football midfielders
Chamois Niortais F.C. players
FC Martigues players
Les Herbiers VF players
Ligue 2 players
Sportspeople from Maine-et-Loire
Footballers from Pays de la Loire